1933–34 La Liga season started on November 5, 1933, and finished on March 4, 1934.

Athletic Bilbao reconquered the title three seasons after. Oviedo made its debut in La Liga and due to the expansion of the league to twelve teams, there were not any relegation at the end of the season.

Team information

League table

Results

Top scorers

Pichichi Trophy 
Note: This list is the alternative top scorers list provided by newspaper Diario Marca; it differs from the one above which is based on official match reports.

References 
La liga top scorers 1933/34

External links 
LFP website

1933 1934
1933–34 in Spanish football leagues
Spain